1000Memories was a website that let people organize, share, and discover old photos and memories and to set up family trees. It was shut down in late 2013 after an acquisition by Ancestry.com.

History
The company was based out of San Francisco, California, and was founded in 2010 after co-founders Brett Huneycutt and Jonathan Good left McKinsey, and co-founder Rudy Adler left Wieden+Kennedy.  Huneycutt and Adler met in elementary school and had previously co-founded the Border Film Project.  Huneycutt and Good met as Rhodes Scholars.

1000Memories was originally funded by Y Combinator, and has received $2.5 million in funding from Greylock Partners.  Additional investors included Paul Buchheit, Keith Rabois, Ron Conway, Caterina Fake, Mike Maples, and Chris Sacca, among others.

In the fall of 2012, 1000Memories was acquired by Ancestry.com for an undisclosed sum.

References

External links 
 

Defunct social networking services
American genealogy websites
Social information processing
Blog hosting services
Privately held companies based in California
Companies based in San Francisco
Internet properties established in 2010
2010 establishments in California
Internet properties disestablished in 2013
2013 disestablishments in California

Y Combinator companies